Periphragella antarcticais a species of glass sponge found in the Weddell Sea.

References

Hexactinellida
Animals described in 2004